The 2016 Tajik League is the 25th season of Tajik League, the Tajikistan Football Federation's top division of association football. FC Istiklol are the defending champions, having won the previous season.

Teams
Prior to the start of the 2016 season, Khosilot Farkhor were promoted, whilst on 25 March 2016, the Tajikistan Football Federation announced that Daleron-Uroteppa had withdrawn from the league due to financial problems.

League table

Results

Season statistics

Scoring
 First goal of the season: Siyovush Asrorov for Istiklol against Parvoz Bobojon Ghafurov (7 April 2016)

Top scorers

Hat-tricks

 5 Player scored 5 goals

References

External links
Football federation of Tajikistan

Tajikistan Higher League seasons
1
Tajik
Tajik